A special election was held in  on October 1, 1822 to fill a vacancy left by the resignation of Caesar A. Rodney (DR) on January 24, 1822, having been elected to the Senate.  This election was held on the same day as the general elections for Congress in Delaware.

Election results

Rodney took his seat December 2, 1822, at the start of the 2nd session of the 17th Congress.

See also
 List of special elections to the United States House of Representatives
 1822 and 1823 United States House of Representatives elections
 List of United States representatives from Delaware

References

1822 at-large
Delaware 1822 at-large
Delaware at-large
Delaware at-large
United States House of Representatives at-large
United States House of Representatives 1822 At-large